A snack is a small portion of food generally eaten between meals. Snacks come in a variety of forms including packaged snack foods and other processed foods, as well as items made from fresh ingredients at home.
	
Traditionally, snacks are prepared from ingredients commonly available at home without a great deal of preparation. Often cold cuts, fruits, leftovers, nuts, sandwiches, and sweets are used as snacks.  With the spread of convenience stores, packaged snack foods became a significant business.
	
Snack foods are typically designed to be portable, quick, and satisfying.  Processed snack foods, as one form of convenience food, are designed to be less perishable, more durable, and more portable than prepared foods.  They often contain substantial amounts of sweeteners, preservatives, and appealing ingredients such as chocolate, peanuts, and specially-designed flavors (such as flavored potato chips).
	
A snack eaten shortly before going to bed or during the night may be called a "bedtime snack", "late night snack", or "midnight snack".

In the United States 
In the United States, a popular snack food is the peanut. Peanuts first arrived from South America via slave ships and became incorporated into African-inspired cooking on southern plantations. After the Civil War, the taste for peanuts spread north, where they were incorporated into the culture of baseball games and vaudeville theaters.

Along with popcorn (also of South American origin), snacks bore the stigma of being sold by unhygienic street vendors. The middle-class etiquette of the Victorian era (1837–1901) categorized any food that did not require proper usage of utensils as lower-class.

Pretzels were introduced to North America by the Dutch, via New Amsterdam in the 17th century. In the 1860s, the snack was still associated with immigrants, unhygienic street vendors, and saloons. Due to loss of business during the Prohibition era (1920-1933), pretzels underwent rebranding to make them more appealing to the public. As packaging revolutionized snack foods, allowing sellers to reduce contamination risk, while making it easy to advertise brands with a logo, pretzels boomed in popularity, bringing many other types of snack foods with it. By the 1950s, snacking had become an all-American pastime, becoming an internationally recognized emblem of middle American life.

In Asia

Indonesia

Kue

Indonesia has a rich collection of snacks called kue (cakes and pastry), both savoury and sweet. Traditional kue is usually made from rice flour, coconut milk, and coconut sugar, and is mostly steamed or fried rather than baked. Traditional kue are popularly known as kue basah ("wet kue") that has a moist, soft texture because of rich coconut milk. Kue kering (dried kue) is the local name for cookies. Indonesia has several variations of kue, both native and foreign-influenced.

Traditional crackers

Traditional crackers are called krupuk, made from bits of shrimp, fish, vegetables or nuts, which are usually consumed as a crunchy snack or an accompaniment to meals. These crispy snacks are sometimes added to main dishes for their crunchy texture; several Indonesian dishes such as gado-gado, karedok, ketoprak, lontong sayur, nasi uduk, asinan and bubur ayam are known to require specific types of krupuk as toppings. There are wide variations of krupuk available across Indonesia. The most popular ones would be krupuk udang (prawn crackers) and krupuk kampung or krupuk putih (cassava crackers).

Other popular types include krupuk kulit (dried buffalo-skin crackers), emping melinjo (gnetum gnemon crackers), and kripik (chips/crisps), such as kripik pisang (banana chips) and keripik singkong (Cassava chips). Rempeyek is a flour-based cracker with brittle of peanuts, anchovies or shrimp bound by a crispy flour cracker. Rengginang or intip (Javanese) is a rice cracker made from sun-dried and deep fried leftover rice.

Japan

Japan has a very wide range of snack foods, some of which that are internationally popular, ranging from onigiri to Melon pan.

Malaysia
 Cincin - a deep fried dough pastry-based snack popular with East Malaysia's Muslim communities.
 Roti john - a spiced meat omelette sandwich, popularly eaten for breakfast or as a snack.
 Bakkwa (Chinese : 肉干) - literally "dried meat", bakkwa is better understood as barbecued meat jerky. While this delicacy is especially popular during the Chinese New Year celebration period, it is available everywhere and eaten year round as a popular snack.
 Idli - made from a mashed mixture of skinned black lentils and rice formed into patties using a mould and steamed, idlis are eaten at breakfast or as a snack. Idlis are usually served in pairs with vadai, small donut-shaped fritters made from mashed lentils and spices, chutney, and a thick stew of lentils and vegetables called sambar.
 Murukku - a savoury snack of spiced crunchy twists made from rice and urad dal flour, traditionally eaten for Deepavali in South India.
 Vadai, vada or vades - is a common term for many different types of savoury fritter-type snacks originated from South India with a set of common ingredients. The most common ingredients are lentils, chillis, onions and curry leaves.
 Tebaloi -  is a sago biscuit snack which is traditionally associated with the Melanau people of Sarawak.
 Pisang goreng - a common snack sold by street vendors, battered fried bananas are also served in a more elaborate manner at some cafes and restaurants as a dessert. Cempedak and various tuber vegetables are also battered and fried in the same manner as variations.

Taiwan
 Taro ball - a traditional Taiwanese cuisine dessert made of taro.
 Suncake (Taiwan) - is a popular Taiwanese dessert originally from the city of Taichung, Taiwan.
 Aiyu jelly - is a jelly made from the gel from the seeds of the awkeotsang creeping fig found in Taiwan.
 Pineapple cake - is a sweet traditional Taiwanese pastry containing butter, flour, egg, milk powder, sugar, and pineapple paste or slices.

Thailand
 Miang kham – dried shrimp and other ingredients wrapped in cha plu leaves; often eaten as a snack or a starter.
 Sai ua – a grilled sausage of ground pork mixed with spices and herbs; it is often served with chopped fresh ginger and chilies at a meal. It is sold at markets in Chiang Mai as a snack.

In the Middle East 

In the Middle East, one of the most important snacks that contain a large amount of proteins is Lupin or lupini beans. Lupin contains around 33-40% protein. Another common snack in the Middle East is hummus made of chickpeas.

Nutrition

Government bodies, such as Health Canada, recommend that people make a conscious effort to eat more healthy, natural snacks, such as fruit, vegetables, nuts, and cereal grains while avoiding high-calorie, low-nutrient junk food.

A 2010 study showed that children in the United States snacked on average six times per day, approximately twice as often as American children in the 1970s. This represents consumption of roughly 570 calories more per day than U.S. children consumed in the 1970s.

Types 

 Apple slices
 Bagel with cream cheese
 Bitterballen
 Candy bar
 Carrot Chips
 Chaat
 Cheese, a larger cold prepared snack
 Cheese puffs/cheese curls
 Chocolate-coated marshmallow treats
 Corn chips and Tortilla chips
 Cocktail sausage
 Cookies
 Crackers
 Deviled eggs
 Doughnuts
 Dried fruits
 Drinkable yogurt
 Edamame, fresh or dried
 Granola bars
 Falafel
 Flour tortilla with a filling
 Frozen berries
 Fruit, whole, sliced, Fruit salad, Fruit cocktail
 Ice cream
 Jell-O
 Jerky
 Kaassoufflé
 Lunchables
 Milkshake
 Muffins
 Nuts
 Pound cake
 Papadum
 Peanuts
 Pita bread
 Popcorn
 Pork rinds
 Potato chips
 Pakoda
 Pretzels
 Raisins
 Ratatouille
 Rice cake
 Rice crackers, distinguished from the above
 Samosa
 Seeds 
 Shortbread
 Smoked salmon
 Smoothie
 Teacake
 Trail mix
 Vegetables (e.g., carrots, celery, cherry tomatoes)
 Yogurt

Image gallery

See also

 Canapés
 Junk food
 List of brand name snack foods
 List of foods
 List of Indian snack foods
 List of Indonesian snacks
 List of Japanese snacks
 List of snack foods
 List of snack foods by country
 Savoury (dish)

References

Meals
Convenience foods